Prairie View is a city in Phillips County, Kansas, United States.  As of the 2020 census, the population of the city was 106.

History
The first post office in Prairie View (also spelled historically Prairieview) was established in July 1879.

Geography
Prairie View is located at  (39.831737, -99.573324).

Demographics

2010 census
As of the census of 2010, there were 134 people, 51 households, and 41 families residing in the city. The racial makeup of the city was 95.5% White and 4.5% from two or more races. Hispanic or Latino of any race were 0.7% of the population.

There were 51 households, of which 43.1% had children under the age of 18 living with them, 60.8% were married couples living together, 9.8% had a female householder with no husband present, 9.8% had a male householder with no wife present, and 19.6% were non-families. 19.6% of all households were made up of individuals, and 11.8% had someone living alone who was 65 years of age or older. The average household size was 2.63 and the average family size was 3.00.

The median age in the city was 35.5 years. 32.1% of residents were under the age of 18; 2.9% were between the ages of 18 and 24; 21.7% were from 25 to 44; 26.2% were from 45 to 64; and 17.2% were 65 years of age or older. The gender makeup of the city was 54.5% male and 45.5% female.

2000 census
As of the census of 2000, there were 141 people, 63 households, and 43 families residing in the city. The racial makeup of the city was 97.87% White and 2.13% Native American. Hispanic or Latino of any race were 2.13% of the population.

There were 63 households, out of which 27.0% had children under the age of 18 living with them, 66.7% were married couples living together, and 31.7% were non-families. 31.7% of all households were made up of individuals, and 27.0% had someone living alone who was 65 years of age or older. The average household size was 2.24 and the average family size was 2.81.

In the city, the population was spread out, with 24.1% under the age of 18, 5.0% from 18 to 24, 17.7% from 25 to 44, 19.1% from 45 to 64, and 34.0% who were 65 years of age or older. The median age was 49 years. For every 100 females, there were 93.2 males. For every 100 females age 18 and over, there were 87.7 males.

The median income for a household in the city was $35,625, and the median income for a family was $36,250. Males had a median income of $30,625 versus $31,250 for females. The per capita income for the city was $16,912. There were 4.8% of families and 7.3% of the population living below the poverty line, including no under eighteens and 11.9% of those over 64.

Education
Prairie View is a part of USD 326 Logan. The Logan High School mascot is Logan Trojans.

Prairie View High School was closed through school unification. The Prairie View High School mascot was Prairie View Pirates.

References

Further reading

External links
 Prairie View - Directory of Public Officials
 USD 326, local school district
 Prairie View city map, KDOT

Cities in Phillips County, Kansas
Cities in Kansas